Par Kuh (also Romanized as Par Kūh) is a village in Gabrik Rural District, in the Central District of Jask County, Hormozgan Province, Iran. At the 2006 census, its population was 362, in 72 families.

References 

Populated places in Jask County